ONTV or variant may refer to:
 ONTV (pay TV), now-defunct American UHF subscription television service owned by National Subscription Television
 ONTV (Egyptian TV channel), now known as ON, an Egyptian digital television channel launched in 2009
 CHCH-DT, the station in Hamilton, Ontario that used the branding "OnTV" during the 1990s
 "On TV" (song), off the 1981 album Adventures in Modern Recording by The Buggles
 ...on TV or ...on Television, ITV latenight programme

See also
 TVOntario